Uto, Utö, or Utō may refer to:

People

Given name
 Uto Ughi (born 1944), Italian violinist and conductor
 Uto Wunderlich (born 1946), German sports shooter

Surname
 Datu Uto (died c. 1900), 18th Sultan of Buayan, Mindanao
 Fumiaki Uto, Japanese astronomer
 Naoki Uto, (born 1991)  Japanese basketball player 
 Shunpei Uto (born 1918), Japanese swimmer
 Takashi Uto (born 1974), Japanese politician

Places 
 Utö (Finland), an island in the Archipelago Sea, in southwest Finland
 Utö, Sweden, an island in the Stockholm archipelago
 Uto, Kumamoto, a city in Japan
 Uto District, Kumamoto, a former district in Japan
 Uto Kulm, the summit of the Uetliberg mountain near Zürich in Switzerland
 Uto Peak, a mountain in the Selkirk Mountains of British Columbia, Canada

Other uses 
 Uto (goddess), Greek for the ancient Egyptian goddess Wadjet
 Uto Station, a railway station in Uto, Kumamoto Prefecture, Japan
 Utō Station, a railway station in Okazaki, Aichi, Japan
 Unattended train operation
 United Tajik Opposition (UTO), a defunct political alliance during the Tajikistani Civil War
 Universidad Técnica de Oruro (UTO), a public university in Oruro, Bolivia
 Untrioctium (chemical symbol Uto), an unsynthesized chemical element with atomic number 138
 Universal Tolerance Organization (UTO), a human rights organization
 UNION TANK Eckstein GmbH

See also
 Uto-Aztecan languages, a Native American language family
 Utto (died 829), first abbot of the Bavarian Metten Abbey
 Udo (disambiguation)

Japanese-language surnames